"I'll Walk with God" is a popular song written for the motion picture The Student Prince with music by Nicholas Brodzsky and lyrics by Paul Francis Webster published in 1954.   The film's title character, who was played by actor Edmund Purdom with singing dubbed by tenor Mario Lanza, sings this song at the coffin of his grandfather, the king of Karlsburg. The song was released on The Student Prince soundtrack album issued by RCA Victor

Mario Lanza re-recorded the song in stereo in 1959.

The song has also been performed or recorded by other tenors including Placido Domingo, Harry Secombe and Michael Crawford.

It also remains popular as a substitute for hymn-tunes in many brass band concert programmes worldwide, in the arrangement by Goff Richards.

References

Songs with music by Nicholas Brodszky
Songs with lyrics by Paul Francis Webster
1954 songs
Mario Lanza songs
Songs written for films